Sinoe may refer to:
 Greenville, Liberia, the capital of Sinoe County in southeastern Liberia
 Sinoe County, Liberia
 Sinoe, a village in the Mihai Viteazu commune, Constanța County, Romania
 the Sinoe Lake, a lagoon in Constanţa County
 the ancient Greek city of Histria (ancient city), located on the shore of the Sinoe Lake
 Sinoe (moth), a genus of moth in the family Gelechiidae
 Sinoe River
 Sinoe oil field
Sinoe (mythology)